On the Blue Side is an album by saxophonist Hank Crawford and organist Jimmy McGriff recorded in 1989 and released on the Milestone label the following year.

Reception 

Allmusic's Scott Yanow said: "Hank Crawford sounds at his best when he has strong melodies to wrap his tone around, and when he can dig into the blues. Both aspects are true during this quartet outing which he co-leads with organist Jimmy McGriff... an excellent soul jazz effort overall".

Track listing
 "Any Day Now" (Burt Bacharach, Bob Hilliard) – 7:15
 "Jimmy's Groove" (Jimmy McGriff) – 4:44
 "The Glory of Love" (Billy Hill) – 5:06
 "You're the One" (Adolph Smith) – 5:24
 "Tuff" (Ace Cannon) – 4:10
 "Jumpin' with Symphony Sid" (Lester Young) – 4:57
 "Gee, Baby, Ain't I Good to You" (Andy Razaf, Don Redman) – 3:30
 "Hank's Groove" (Hank Crawford) – 5:26

Personnel
Hank Crawford  – alto saxophone
Jimmy McGriff – organ
Jimmy Ponder – guitar
Vance James − drums

References

 

Milestone Records albums
Hank Crawford albums
Jimmy McGriff albums
1990 albums
Albums produced by Bob Porter (record producer)
Albums recorded at Van Gelder Studio